Kirnapur tehsil is a fourth-order administrative and revenue division, a subdivision of third-order administrative and revenue division of Balaghat district of Madhya Pradesh.

Geography
Kirnapur tehsil has an area of 709.49 sq kilometers. It is bounded by Balaghat tehsil in the northwest, Paraswada tehsil in the north, Baihar tehsil in the northeast and east, Lanji tehsil in the southeast, Maharashtra in the south and southwest and Waraseoni tehsil in the west.

See also 
Balaghat district

Citations

External links

Tehsils of Madhya Pradesh
Balaghat district